The FPS Interior, formerly the Ministry of the Interior, is a Federal Public Service of Belgium. It was created by Royal Order on 14 January 2002, as part of the plans of the Verhofstadt I Government to modernise the federal administration. The FPS Interior employs approximately 4,300 persons and is responsible for guaranteeing the rule of law, the registration and identification of natural persons, the immigration policy and for guaranteeing public order and safety.

The acronym IBZ comes from a mixture of its French and Dutch names,  .

The FPS Interior is responsible to the Federal Minister of the Interior, Institutional Reforms and Democratic Renewal, Annelies Verlinden, since October 2020.

Organisations
The FPS Interior is organised into five Directorates-General:
The Directorate-General for Institutions and Population
National Register
eID
Elections
Three freedom of information commissions
The Directorate-General for Civil Security
The Belgian Civil Protection falls under this Directorate-General
The Directorate-General Crisis Centre
The Directorate-General for Security and Prevention Policy
The Immigration Service

External links
Website of the FPS Interior Belgium

Interior
Belgium
Belgium
Belgium
Belgium, Interior
2002 establishments in Belgium